Charles Leo Jackson  (born March 19, 1963) is an American former professional baseball player who played mostly third base in the Major League Baseball (MLB) for the Houston Astros in 1987 and 1988 and the Texas Rangers in 1994.

Career
Jackson attended the University of Hawaii at Manoa and was drafted by the Astros in the seventh round of the 1984 Major League Baseball draft. He played at the AAA level each year from 1985 through 1994, and retired after playing for the St. Paul Saints of the Northern League in 1996.

External links
, or Retrosheet, or Pura Pelota (Venezuelan Winter League)

1963 births
Living people
American expatriate baseball players in Canada
Asheville Tourists players
Auburn Astros players
Baseball players from California
Calgary Cannons players
Cardenales de Lara players
American expatriate baseball players in Venezuela
Columbus Astros players
Edmonton Trappers players
Hawaii Rainbow Warriors baseball players
Houston Astros players
Major League Baseball third basemen
Oklahoma City 89ers players
Omaha Royals players
Phoenix Firebirds players
Baseball players from Seattle
St. Paul Saints players
Texas Rangers players
Tiburones de La Guaira players
Tucson Toros players
University of Hawaiʻi at Mānoa alumni
Anchorage Bucs players